Garry Lynn Kimble (born April 5, 1963) is a former American football cornerback in the National Football League for the Washington Redskins.  He played college football at Sam Houston State University and was drafted in the eleventh round of the 1985 NFL Draft.

1963 births
Living people
Sportspeople from Lake Charles, Louisiana
Players of American football from Louisiana
Sam Houston Bearkats football players
American football cornerbacks
Washington Redskins players